Due to the withdrawal of Venezuela the two teams in this group played against each other on a home-and-away basis. The winner Brazil qualified for the sixth FIFA World Cup held in Sweden.

Table

Matches

References

External links
FIFA official page
RSSSF - 1958 World Cup Qualification
Allworldcup

1
1957 in Brazilian football
1957 in Peruvian football
1957 in Venezuelan sport